Andy Murray defeated the two-time defending champion Novak Djokovic in the final, 6–3, 6–3 to win the men's singles tennis title at the 2016 Italian Open.

Seeds
The top eight seeds receive a bye into the second round.

Draw

Finals

Top half

Section 1

Section 2

Bottom half

Section 3

Section 4

Qualifying

Seeds

Qualifiers

Lucky losers

Qualifying draw

First qualifier

Second qualifier

Third qualifier

Fourth qualifier

Fifth qualifier

Sixth qualifier

Seventh qualifier

References

Main Draw
Qualifying Draw

Men's Singles
2016 ATP World Tour